The Be Loud! Sophie Foundation is a nonprofit organization based in Chapel Hill, North Carolina, United States, which supports care for young adults with cancer at UNC Hospitals. It was established by the family of Sophie Steiner, who died from cancer at the age of 15. Its major event is an annual concert at Cat's Cradle, a music venue in the neighboring town of Carrboro.

History

In 2012, 14-year-old Sophie Steiner, a freshman at East Chapel Hill High School, was diagnosed with metastatic germ-cell cancer, and died ten months later on August 30, 2013. Be Loud! targets an area which Steiner called the "no-man's land" between pediatric and adult oncology. Her mother told Indy Week: 
Her sisters Annabel and Elsa, and her parents, Lucy and Niklaus Steiner, created Be Loud! to support patients and families in similar conditions. Be Loud!'s mission is "[t]o support adolescent and young adult cancer patients and their families at UNC Hospitals". The foundation is named after a poem written by Sophie on her blog.

Fundraising activities

Concerts

Be Loud! has hosted concerts at the Cat's Cradle and Fearrington Village. The first Cat's Cradle concert, in 2014, reunited the band Let's Active, with the Pressure Boys headlining, also featuring The Connells, the Dex Romweber Duo, and A Number of Things. In 2015, the concert had the Red Clay Ramblers, Tift Merritt, Don Dixon. and Southern Culture on the Skids. At the 2016 event, performers included English Beat, Greg Humphreys' band Hobex, Chris Stamey's jazz group Occasional Shivers, Preeesh!, and others. The 2017 concert featured Atlanta band Drivin' N' Cryin', Rob Ladd and The Spressials (covering The Specials), and Triangle bands Hege V, the Backsliders, the Floating Children, and Boom Unit Brass Band. In 2018, musical acts included Matthew Sweet, Surrender Human, the Sex Police, the Veldt, Collapsis, and the Right Profile.

Other fundraising

A Boy Scout troop biked 66 days across the contiguous United States raising money for the organization. The foundation has also participated at local events, such as the Color the Hill run and the Blue Ridge 200-mile relay. A cupcake truck in St. Louis, Missouri, was created and sent all their profits to Be Loud!

Young-adult cancer care

The organization created a position at the UNC Lineberger Comprehensive Cancer Center for Lauren Lux, a clinical social worker, who works with cancer patients in their early-teens to mid-20s. For Be Loud!, Lux is the adolescent and young adults (AYA) program director. "Sometimes I describe my job by telling people, 'I'm here to make this suck a little less,'" Lux told The Herald-Sun of Durham.

Lux's main role is coordinating schedules and offering activities for AYA patients at UNC. Be Loud! brings age-appropriate resources and services to patients to let them "be themselves". Lux has taken patients rock climbing at Pilot Mountain.

References

External links
 

2014 establishments in North Carolina
Organizations established in 2014
Charities based in North Carolina
Children's charities based in the United States
Cancer charities in the United States
Medical and health foundations in the United States
Charities for young adults